Don't Lose the Music is a national campaign launched by RNID, the charity representing the 9 million deaf and hard of hearing people in the UK.

Objectives 
The campaign aims to highlight the danger of listening to music too loudly – mainly focusing on exposure to loud music:
 at nightclubs
 at concerts/gigs
 on personal audio equipment

Experts  agree that exposure to sounds over 85 dB over time can cause damage to hearing. Many concert venues and nightclubs play music at levels over 100 decibels. It is also possible to listen to music on personal audio equipment (such as MP3 players) at levels which exceed damage-risk criteria, depending on the equipment.

Damage to hearing is caused by a combination of three factors – length of exposure to the noise, the average level of the noise and the peak level of the noise. Another variable is individual susceptibility to hearing damage, which varies from person to person. Individual susceptibility is only known after hearing damage has been done.

A rule of thumb is that the louder the sound, the less time you should listen to it for.

Exposure to loud music can lead to a range of hearing problems such as noise induced hearing loss, tinnitus and hyperacusis.

Here are some commonly quoted comparisons of sound levels:
 0 dB(A) - the lowest sound level a person with normal hearing can detect
 20 dB(A) - a quiet room at night
 60 dB(A) - ordinary spoken conversation
 80 dB(A) - shouting
 90 dB(A) - an underground railway
 110 dB(A) - a pneumatic drill nearby
 130 dB(A) - an aeroplane taking off 100m (330 feet) away

Events 
In order to promote the campaign, RNID attend music festivals and gigs, handing out earplugs and information.

See also
 Hearing protectors
 RNID
 Noise-induced hearing loss

References 

 "Output Levels of Portable Digital Music Players," Cory D. F. Portnuff and Brian J. Fligor, Sc.D., CCC-A, Thursday, October 19, 2006, 1:30 PM; laypaper at https://web.archive.org/web/20071030124816/http://www.hearingconservation.org/docs/virtualPressRoom/portnuff.htm
 "Does earphone type affect risk for recreational noise-induced hearing loss?" Brian J. Fligor, Sc.D., CCC-A and Terri Ives, Sc.D, Thursday, October 19, 2006, 1:50 PM; laypaper at https://web.archive.org/web/20070929082154/http://www.hearingconservation.org/docs/virtualPressRoom/FligorIves.pdf

External links
 Don't Lose The Music website

Music charities based in the United Kingdom
Deafness charities